St. Margarets Bay is a bay located on the Atlantic coast of Nova Scotia, Canada on the border of Halifax County (Halifax Regional Municipality) and Lunenburg County (Municipality of the District of Chester).

Description

Opening south directly onto the Atlantic, the bay's eastern shore is formed by the Chebucto Peninsula and its western shore by the Aspotogan Peninsula, while the head of the bay (the northern shore) is the main part of the Nova Scotia peninsula.

The bay's shoreline is mostly rocky, although the head of the bay offers several sandy beaches at Queensland, Black Point and Cleveland; another sandy beach exists on the western shore of the bay at Bayswater and there is a small sandy beach along the eastern shore on Micou's Island. St. Margarets Bay is a cruising destination for sailing yachts as its picturesque shorelines offer protection in many natural harbours, as well as anchorages in coves and near small islands.

Communities

Eastern Shore
Along the Chebucto Peninsula (from south to north):
 Peggys Cove
 Indian Harbour
 Hackett's Cove
 Glen Margaret
 Seabright
 French Village
 Glen Haven
 Tantallon
 Whynacht's Point
 Upper Tantallon

Northern Shore
Along the head of the bay (from east to west):
 Allen Heights
 Todd's Island
 Head of St. Margarets Bay
 Mason's Point
 Boutilier's Point
 Ingramport
 Black Point
 Queensland
 Hubbards

Western Shore
Along the Aspotogan Peninsula (from north to south):
 Fox Point
 Mill Cove
 Birchy Head 
 The Lodge
 Northwest Cove
 Southwest Cove
 Aspotogan
 Bayswater

Islands
St. Margarets Bay contains numerous islands, particularly along its eastern shore.  These islands were historically used by the Mi'kmaq Nation and some contain burial sites.

The bay's larger islands are listed below:

 Southwest Island
 Horse Island
 Shut-in Island
 Croucher Island
 Owls Head Island (connected to the mainland by a small bridge)
 Moser's Island
 Micou's Island

Swissair 111

The Swissair Flight 111 Memorial is located at The Whalesback, a promontory approximately 1 km northwest of Peggys Cove. It is one of two memorials built to commemorate the victims of the Swissair Flight 111 disaster, which crashed into St. Margarets Bay on 2 September 1998. The crash site is roughly equidistant between the Whalesback Memorial and another memorial at Bayswater, Nova Scotia, located on the Aspotogan Peninsula on the western shore of the bay, opposite Peggys Cove.

The monument reads in English and French: "In memory of the 229 men, women and children aboard Swissair Flight 111 who perished off these shores September 2nd, 1998. They have been joined to the sea, and the sky. May they rest in peace."

The site of the crash and the two monuments form a triangle. The three notches on the monument at Whalesback represent the numerals 111. The sight line from the three grooves in the stone points to the crash site, while the markings on the facing stone point to the memorial at Bayswater. The memorial wall at Bayswater lists the names of the passengers and crew. The facing stone points to the crash site.

War Plan Red
In the period between World War I and World War II the US military drew up a series of Colour Coded War Plans based on likely global threats. War Plan Red denoted a planned attack against the British Empire and by extension War Plan Crimson which called for an invasion of Canada. The plan involved an attack on many fronts starting with a seabourne invasion of Halifax and Canada's Maritime provinces via St. Margarets Bay.

External links
 Google Map-based guide to all of the islands in the Bay, including photos and ownership information.
 Peggy's Cove Coastal Region St. Margaret's Bay Regional Tourism Development Association

References

Nautical chart #4386 St. Margarets Bay, published by Canadian Hydrographic Service, 2004

Bays of Nova Scotia
Landforms of Halifax, Nova Scotia
Landforms of Lunenburg County, Nova Scotia
Landforms of Halifax County, Nova Scotia